Thoresen  is a  Norwegian surname. Notable people with the surname include:

Børt-Erik Thoresen,  Norwegian television host and folk singer
Carl E. Thoresen, American psychologist
Gunnar Thoresen (footballer) (1920-2017), Norwegian footballer
Gunnar Thoresen (bobsledder)  (1921–1972), Norwegian bobsledder
Hallvar Thoresen), Norwegian footballer
Jan Thoresen, Norwegian curler
Magdalene Thoresen, Scandinavian writer
Patrick Thoresen, Norwegian professional ice hockey left winger
Petter Thoresen (orienteering), Norwegian orienteering competitor
Petter Thoresen (ice hockey),  Norwegian ice hockey manager and former player
Simeon Thoresen, Norwegian cage fighter
Synnøve Thoresen, Norwegian biathlete
Tom Thoresen, Norwegian politician for the Labour Party

See also
Thorson

Norwegian-language surnames